Hockey Club Bloemendaal, commonly known as Bloemendaal, is a Dutch field hockey club based in Bloemendaal, North Holland. It was established on 26 April 1895, and is one of the oldest field hockey clubs in the Netherlands. Originally, the club also played bandy. HC Bloemendaal is one of the most successful clubs in the Netherlands, with the men's team competing for the title in the highest league ("Hoofdklasse") nearly every year.

Honours

Men
National title / Hoofdklasse
 Winners (22): 1918–19, 1919–20, 1920–21, 1921–22, 1922–23, 1985-86, 1986-87, 1987-88, 1988-89, 1990-91, 1992-93, 1998-99, 1999-2000, 2001-02, 2005-06, 2006-07, 2007-08, 2008-09, 2009–10, 2018–19, 2020–21, 2021–22
 Runners-up (12): 1917–18, 1921–22, 1923–24, 1924–25, 1984–85, 1991–92, 1993–94, 1995–96, 2003–04, 2004–05, 2010–11, 2013–14
Euro Hockey League
Winners (5): 2008–09, 2012–13, 2017–18, 2021, 2022
EuroHockey Club Champions Cup: 2
Winners (2): 1987, 2001
Runners-up (3): 1988, 1994, 2000
EuroHockey Cup Winners Cup
Winners (1): 2006
Dutch national title indoor hockey
Winners (1): 1986–87

Women
Gold Cup
Winners (1): 2017–18

Players

Current squad

Men's squad
Head coach: Rick Mathijssen

Women's squad
Head coach: Dave Smolenaars

Notable players

Men's internationals
 
 
 
 Jamie Dwyer
 Blake Govers
 
 Arthur Van Doren
 
 Tibor Weißenborn
 Christopher Zeller
 
 Sardara Singh
 
 Rodrigo Garza

Women's internationals
/ 
 Inge Vermeulen
 Danique Visser
 
 Cecilia Rognoni
 Pilar Romang
/ 
 Helen Richardson-Walsh
 Kate Richardson-Walsh
 
 Anna O'Flanagan
 Chloe Watkins

References

External links
  Official website HC Bloemendaal

 
Dutch field hockey clubs
Field hockey clubs established in 1895
1895 establishments in the Netherlands
HC Bloemendaal
Sports clubs in North Holland
Defunct bandy clubs